Paul Draper may refer to:
 Paul Draper (dancer) (1909–1996), American dancer
 Paul Draper (winemaker) (born 1936), American winemaker
 Paul Draper (philosopher) (born 1957), American philosopher
 Paul Draper (priest) (born 1964), Church of Ireland Dean of Lismore
 Paul Draper (musician) (born 1970), English singer-songwriter and former Mansun frontman
 Paul Draper (cricketer) (born 1972), English cricketer
 Paul W. Draper (magician) (born 1978), American magician, actor, film maker and anthropologist
 Paul Draper (bassoonist) (fl. 1933), British musician with London Baroque Ensemble under Karl Haas (conductor)